The Canton of Fraize is a French former administrative and electoral grouping of communes in the Vosges département of eastern France and in the region of Lorraine. It was disbanded following the French canton reorganisation which came into effect in March 2015. It had 12,304 inhabitants (2012).

Positioned within the Arrondissement of Saint-Dié-des-Vosges, the canton had its administrative centre at Fraize.

Composition
The Canton of Fraize comprised the following 9 communes:

 Anould
 Ban-sur-Meurthe-Clefcy
 La Croix-aux-Mines
 Entre-deux-Eaux
 Fraize 
 Mandray 
 Plainfaing 
 Saint-Léonard 
 Le Valtin

References

Fraize
2015 disestablishments in France
States and territories disestablished in 2015